The Artificial Limb & Appliance Service (ALAS) is an NHS Wales organisation providing support, equipment and rehabilitation to people with permanent or long-term impairment. It is commissioned by Health Commission Wales (an executive agency of the Welsh Assembly Government), and is provided through a consortium arrangement between three NHS Wales trusts, each hosting one centre (ALAC). The centres are situated in:
Cardiff at Rookwood Hospital (part of the Cardiff and Vale University Health Board)
Swansea at Morriston Hospital (part of the Abertawe Bro Morgannwg University Health Board)
Wrexham at Maelor Hospital (part of the Betsi Cadwaladr University Health Board)

History
The Artificial Limb & Appliance Service originated during the First World War. The War Office (precursor to the British Ministry of Defence) set up a service in Roehampton to deal with the needs of military amputees.

From the 1960s, the service had expanded and was operated by the UK Government's Department of Health and Social Security for a largely civilian population.  By then, wheelchair supply and other related disablement services had been added to the remit. The majority of service users were elderly individuals who often had disabilities due to systemic medical conditions.

In 1984 the British government set up the McColl working party to review and report on the quality and management of disablement services in England. In 1986 it recommended a new management board should be set up to manage their efficiency and cost effectiveness.  As a result, the Disablement Services Authority (DSA) was set up in England to manage the 49 Artificial Limb & Appliance Centres (ALACs) through regional and district health authorities by 1991.  ALAC services were transferred to the National Health Service in England in July 1991.

After a period of consultation, it was agreed the Welsh Health Common Services Authority (WHCSA) should assume operational management responsibility for the services in April 1988.  The Artificial Eye Service in Wales remained under Welsh Office management until it too was transferred to the WHCSA in 1993.  At the time, it was agreed that the transfer should be for an interim period - April 1988 to April 1991.  There would then be further consultation with the wider NHS in Wales.

In 1995 the Secretary of State decided that the management of ALAS should transfer to the University Hospital of Wales, Morriston and Wrexham

External links 
Artificial Limb & Appliance Service Website
Health of Wales Information Service (Howis)

NHS Wales